Alexandria railway station is a railway terminus in Alexandria, Egypt.

History
The station is the current terminus of the line, which was extended from Sidi Gaber railway station in 1876.

References

Railway stations in Egypt
Railway stations opened in 1876